Amit Kumar Nayan (born 15 June 1988) is a Bangladeshi cricketer. He plays for Abahani Limited cricket team in Dhaka Premier Division Cricket League matches.

References

Living people
1988 births
Bangladeshi cricketers
Rangpur Riders cricketers
Abahani Limited cricketers
Mohammedan Sporting Club cricketers
People from Jessore District
Bangladeshi Hindus